Camidge is a surname of English origin. People with that name include:

 Camidge family, several of whom were organists at York Minster (from 1756), some of whom have standalone articles (see below)
 Charles Camidge (1838–1911), Anglican Bishop of Bathurst
 John Henry Norrison Camidge (1853–1939), British composer and organist
 Thomas Simpson Camidge (1828–1913), British organist and composer
 Walter Camidge (1912–1987), also known as William A Camidge, English footballer
 William Camidge (1828–1909), British solicitor and author

See also
 

Surnames of English origin